Heidi Seevers Gansert (born 1963) is an American politician, businessperson, and engineer from the state of Nevada serving in the Nevada Senate, representing the 15th district since 2016. She served in the Nevada Assembly from 2004 through 2010, including as Republican leader, and as chief of staff to Governor Brian Sandoval from 2011 through 2012. She is a Republican.

Career
Gansert was elected to the Nevada Assembly in 2004, representing District 25 (part of Washoe County). She became assistant minority leader in 2007 and minority leader in 2009. Gansert opted not to seek reelection in the 2010 elections.

When Brian Sandoval, a childhood friend, won the 2010 election to become Governor of Nevada, Gansert led his transition team and became his chief of staff. She resigned from the Governor's office in August 2012 and was hired by the University of Nevada, Reno as a special assistant for external affairs in October 2012.  Gansert's job description was announced as focusing on economic and workplace development, with an annual salary of $180,000.

Gansert was elected to the Nevada Senate in the 2016 elections, representing part of Washoe County.

Political positions
Gansert has displayed a mix of moderate and conservative policy positions during her time in public office.  For instance, in 2017 Gansert voted for a budget compromise worked out between Republican Governor Sandoval and the Democratic leadership of the Legislature, despite strong conservative criticism at the imposition of a tax on marijuana and a lack of funding for private schools.  However, Gansert has also displayed conservative positions, such as her opposition to the decriminalization of abortion in Nevada, on the grounds that the parental notification requirement and other restrictions should remain in place.

Personal life
Gansert's husband is an emergency medicine doctor. Gansert participates in marathons and triathlons. She and her husband have four children, and live in Reno.  Gansert holds a BS in engineering from Santa Clara University and an MBA from University of Nevada, Reno.  In addition to her current position at UNR, Gansert has previously worked as a management consultant for medical firms and a resource planning engineer for NV Energy.

Elections
2016 After Republican incumbent Greg Brower's resignation, Gansert won the Republican primary election for Senate District 15 with 5,105 votes (56.91%) against Eugene Hoover.  Gansert won the general election with 33,822 votes (52.96%) against Democratic nominee Devon Reese and another candidate.
2008 Gansert was unopposed in the primary and won the general election with 19,680 votes (60.16%) against Democratic nominee Robert Townsend.
2006 Gansert was unopposed in both the primary and general elections.
2004 After Republican incumbent Dawn Gibbons left the Assembly in order to run for Congress, Gansert won the Republican primary election for Assembly District 25 with 4,724 votes (59.32%) against Robin Levy and another candidate.  Gansert then won the general election with 19,167 votes (66.58%) against Democratic nominee Dan Meyer.

References

External links
Official page at the Nevada Legislature

1963 births
21st-century American politicians
21st-century American women politicians
Chiefs of staff to United States state governors
Living people
Politicians from Reno, Nevada
Republican Party members of the Nevada Assembly
Santa Clara University alumni
University of Nevada, Reno alumni
Women state legislators in Nevada